The ribbed slitshell, scientific name Gyrotoma pumila, was a species of freshwater snail with a gill and an operculum, an aquatic gastropod mollusk in the family Pleuroceridae family.  This species was endemic to the United States. The IUCN conducted an assessment in 2000 that determined the ribbed slitshell was extinct. This status was published in the 2000 Red List.

References

Pleuroceridae
Extinct gastropods
Gastropods described in 1860
Taxonomy articles created by Polbot